Mohammad El Halabi is a Palestinian aid worker and Gaza manager for World Vision International in Palestine detained by Israel since 2016. On 15 June, 2022, he was found guilty of "membership of a terrorist organisation, financing terrorist activities, having "transmitted information to the enemy", and possession of a weapon". World Vision said there would be an appeal. Independent auditors and the Australian government found "no evidence of wrongdoing or diversion of funds."

The EU tweeted "According to OHCHR, the verdict is deeply problematic as it is based on secret evidence, with the defendant having been detained for 6 years without a verdict. This is inconsistent with international fair trial standards. Without a fair and due process, justice for Halabi cannot be served."

In 2020, four United Nations special rapporteurs demanded Mr. Halabi be given a fair trial or be released unconditionally. The experts said that after his arrest, Mr. Halabi was questioned for 50 days without access to a lawyer and that "What is happening to Mr. el-Halabi bears no relation to the trial standards we expect from democracies, and is part of a pattern where Israel uses secret evidence to indefinitely detain hundreds of Palestinians."

Personal life and family

Halabi was born in 1978 in the Jabalia refugee camp which his family had fled to from their village 15 miles to the north during the 1947–1949 Palestine war. Halabi’s father Khalil worked at UNRWA, working closely with the organization's director for Gaza and attending meetings with the likes of Tony Blair and John Kerry.

Halabi went on to study engineering at the Islamic University of Gaza, the foremost engineering university in Gaza, where he was a member of the Fatah club. The Halabi family more generally also had a history of opposition to Hamas, and Halabi's younger brother, Hamed, was once injured participating in one of the rare demonstrations in Gaza against Hamas rule.

In 2003, Halabi married his wife Ola, with whom he has five children. In 2004, in response to the declining conditions in Gaza, Halabi swapped his engineering career for aid work.

Detention and trial

Halabi was arrested on June 15, 2016 at the Erez Crossing into the Gaza Strip and charged by Israeli prosecutors with channeling funds to Hamas. This was based on accusations by Israel's Shin Bet intelligence agency that Halabi had siphoned off $48 million in funds from the budget of World Vision, of which he was a program manager, to Hamas over the course of six years.

Shortly after his arrest, Halabi's lawyer, Muhammad Mahmoud, stated that his client has nothing to do with Hamas and that the fact that the investigation had lasted 55 days proved that there were problems with the evidence. Halabi confessed to diverting funds on 4 August, three weeks after the raid, but has claimed to have made the statement under duress in the form of beating by interrogators, treatment which the UN has said “may amount to torture”. The statement was not made to any official government authority but to a prison informer.

World Vision denied the allegations of financial irregularity, stating that all of its operations were properly overseen and audited, while describing Halabi as a well-regarded humanitarian.

Speaking in 2016, Tim Costello, chief executive of World Vision Australia, labelled the charges "profoundly incomprehensible", noting the stark mismatch between the Israeli Government's claims and the NGO's total budget in the area: "What we know is our total operating budget in Gaza for the past 10 years was approximately $22.5 million, and yet the figures being circulated are up to $50 million has been diverted from him."

In a statement by World Vision, the NGO said Halabi "was the manager of our Gaza operations only since October 2014", and that "before that time he managed only portions of the Gaza budget", when, at his managerial level, the organization's accountability processes would have capped his signing authority at $15,000.

In March 2017, the Australian government concluded a study that found no evidence any funds had been diverted. This was followed in July 2017 by an independent forensic audit commissioned by World Vision that similarly found no funds missing and no evidence of criminal activity. Since March 2021, Halabi's defense has claimed that in addition to the alleged confession being coerced, the original document recording the confession appears to have been lost.

According to Michael Omer-Man, director of research at Democracy for the Arab World Now, Halabi's charges include treason despite him being from Gaza and neither an Israeli citizen nor resident. Halabi's lawyers Maher Hanna and Jonathan Kuttab have noted that the trial is also partly reliant on 'secret evidence' that has been withheld from observers. Hanna and Kuttab described the persuasiveness of the material as "embarrassing".

In November 2020, UN Special Rapporteur on human rights Michael Lynk and three colleagues stated: "What is happening to [Halabi] bears no relation to the trial standards we expect from democracies, and is part of a pattern where Israel uses secret evidence to indefinitely detain hundreds of Palestinians," while noting that it was "particularly disturbing that the prosecution is relying upon confessions allegedly obtained by force while he was denied access to a lawyer, and on testimony from undercover informers." The UN special rapporteurs demanded Mr. Halabi be given a fair trial or be released unconditionally.

By July 2021, the court proceedings against Halabi had been running for five years without conclusion or the materialization of a credible body of evidence, despite a cumulative 165 court sessions, a count that had risen to 167 by March 2022. The trial has dragged on for so long that under Israeli law, the Supreme Court must actively extend it every three months. The latest 90-day extension was approved on 22 February 2022.

Wafa, the official news agency run by the Palestinian National Authority, has stated that the case is "the longest trial in the history of Palestinian detainees held in Israeli prisons".

Halabi has continued to insist that he is innocent, refusing multiple offers of a plea deal over the years, and the defense has noted: "The facts are very clear and the case should have been dropped a long time ago … but the Israelis need to find a face-saving way out since Mohammed refused a plea deal."

The Israeli government is said to be under increasing international pressure to resolve the case and bring the aid worker's indeterminate detention to an end.

Court verdict

On 15 June, 2022, he was found guilty of "membership of a terrorist organisation, financing terrorist activities, having "transmitted information to the enemy", and possession of a weapon". World Vision said there would be an appeal. Independent auditors and the Australian government found "no evidence of wrongdoing or diversion of funds."

Despite the verdict, the court's decision "did not describe the diversion of any financial aid to Hamas", but merely rejected World Vision's assertion of strong controls over its own finances, alongside secret evidence including an alleged confession based on the testimony of another prisoner and, and, according to Halabi's lawyer, under duress.

The EU tweeted "According to OHCHR, the verdict is deeply problematic as it is based on secret evidence, with the defendant having been detained for 6 years without a verdict. This is inconsistent with international fair trial standards. Without a fair and due process, justice for Halabi cannot be served."

Halabi's case is unusual among Palestinian detainess in the refusal of the accused to accept a plea deal. Prisoners’ rights group Addameer has noted that many Palestinian detainees "plead guilty for offences they did not commit" in the expectation that they will not in any case receive justice through the Israeli civil and military court systems. With the backing of his former employer, World Vision, Halabi has remained adamant in his refusal of the charges, despite the multiple offers of plea deals over the years.

References

External links 

1983 births
Living people
People of the Israeli–Palestinian conflict
Palestinian people imprisoned by Israel
People imprisoned on charges of terrorism